Stefan Haas (born 29 June 1994) is a German professional footballer who plays as a midfielder.

Career
Until 2011, Haas played in the youth of SE Freising. For the 2011–12 season he moved to SpVgg Unterhaching, where he played in the youth team. In the 2012–13 season Haas received a professional contract that ran until 2015, but continued to play only in the U-19s and in the second team in the fifth-rate Bayernliga.

On 27 July 2013, Haas played his first professional game as a substitute against Chemnitzer FC. He made his starting eleven debut on 31 August 2013 (6th matchday) in a 3–1 home win against 1. FC Saarbrücken.

After spells in Portugal with Mirandela, Almancilense and Leixões, Haas returned to Germany in the beginning of 2020, when he signed with VfR Garching.

Personal life
Stefan Haas is the younger brother of Maximilian Haas, who also was a professional soccer player and used to play for the second team of FC Bayern Munich, the English club Middlesbrough and the Portuguese club Sporting Braga.

References

External links

1994 births
Living people
German footballers
Association football midfielders
3. Liga players
Campeonato de Portugal (league) players
SpVgg Unterhaching players
SpVgg Unterhaching II players
S.R. Almancilense players
Leixões S.C. players
VfR Garching players
German expatriate footballers
German expatriate sportspeople in Portugal
Expatriate footballers in Portugal